Louis Caron (born July 21, 1942) is a Canadian journalist and writer from Quebec. He is most noted for his novels The Draft Dodger (L'Emmitouflé), which won the Prix Québec-Paris in 1977, Le canard de bois, which was a finalist for the Governor General's Award for French-language fiction at the 1981 Governor General's Awards, and Les fils de la liberté II: La corne de brume, which was a finalist for the same award at the 1982 Governor General's Awards, and as co-creator and writer of the television drama series He Shoots, He Scores (Lance et compte).

He worked as a journalist for Radio-Canada and Le Nouvelliste prior to publishing his first novel, L'Illusioniste, in 1973.

In 2015 he published ''Le visionnaire, the first novel in a new trilogy of historical novels which represented his first new published work since 2005.

Works
 L'Illusionniste (1973)
 L'Emmitouflé (1977)
 Le Bonhomme Sept-heures  
 Le Canard de bois (1981)
 Les Fils de la liberté II. La Corne de brume (1982)
 Racontages (1983)
 Le Vrai Voyage de Jacques Cartier (1984)  
 Marco-Polo : Le nouveau livre des merveilles (1985)  
 La Vie d'artiste (1987)
 Au fond des mers (1987)
 Les Fils de la liberté III. Le coup de poing (1990)
 Les Chemins du Nord . La tuque et le béret (1992-1993)
 Les Chemins du Nord II. Le Bouleau et l'épinette (1993)
 Montréal : un parfum d'îles (1994)
 Terre des Inuit (1997)
 Les Chemins du Nord III. L'outarde et la palombe (1999)
 Le Corps collectionneur (2000)
 Il n'y a plus d'Amérique (2002)
 Tête heureuse (2005)
 Le Temps des bâtisseurs 1. Le visionnaire (2015)

References

1942 births
20th-century Canadian novelists
21st-century Canadian novelists
Canadian male novelists
Canadian historical novelists
Canadian novelists in French
Canadian television writers
Writers from Quebec
French Quebecers
People from Sorel-Tracy
Living people
Canadian newspaper journalists
Canadian male journalists
20th-century Canadian male writers
21st-century Canadian male writers
Canadian male television writers